The 1992 Recopa Sudamericana was the fourth Recopa Sudamericana, an annual football match between the winners of the previous season's Copa Libertadores and Supercopa Sudamericana competitions.

The match was contested by Colo-Colo, winners of the 1991 Copa Libertadores winners, and Cruzeiro, winners of the 1991 Supercopa Sudamericana, at the Kobe Universiade Memorial Stadium in Kobe on April 19, 1992. Colo-Colo managed to defeat Cruzeiro 5–4 on penalties after a 0–0 tie and obtain their second international title. Mirko Jozić became the first, and so far only, non-South American manager to win the title.

Qualified teams

Match details

References 

Rec
Recopa Sudamericana
Recopa Sudamericana 1992
Recopa Sudamericana 1992
Recopa Sudamericana 1992
1992
Rec
RecE
Recopa Sudamericana 1992

es:Recopa Sudamericana 1991